The Frunziș (also: Leveleș) is a right tributary of the river Teuz in Romania. It flows into the Teuz near Tămașda. The construction of the canalized lower course of the Beliu in 1914-19 disconnected it from its upper course, which now discharges into the Beliu near Berechiu.

References

Rivers of Romania
Rivers of Arad County
Rivers of Bihor County